Beyond All Boundaries is a 2009 short film depicting the battles of World War II. The film is shown in 4-D, and includes archive footage and special effects. The short, produced and narrated by Tom Hanks and directed by David Briggs, was released 9 November 2009 and is shown solely in The National World War II Museum, New Orleans. It was designed purely for the Solomon Victory Theater within the museum, and is only shown in this one location.

Solomon Victory Theater makes use of vibrating seats and atmospheric effects to enhance the viewing experience. In addition, there are also moving props and scenery, lighting and sound effects and a multi-layered projection process.

The film makes use of the writings and documented accounts of World War II veterans.

In 2011, Beyond All Boundaries received a Thea Award for Outstanding Achievement from the Themed Entertainment Association.

Cast

References

External links
 
 

2009 short films
American short films
American World War II films
2009 films
2000s English-language films